Ricco & Claudia is a Slovak music duo consisting of Richard Ricco Šárközi and Klaudia Farkas. Together they won the seventh season of the Hungarian version of the X Factor. Previously, in 2014, they had finished as runners-up of the first season of the Slovak version of the programme.

References

External links

The X Factor winners